John Samuel Letts Dawkins (born 3 July 1954) is a South Australian Politician. He was a member of the South Australian Legislative Council, representing the South Australian Division of the Liberal Party of Australia from 1997 until 2020, when he was expelled for accepting the opposition's nomination as President of the Legislative Council. He served as an independent MLC, and as president, until March 2022, when he retired.

He was first elected to an eight-year term in the Legislative Council at the 1997 election. He was re-elected for a second eight-year term at the 2006 election, and a third eight-year term at the 2014 election.

Before his entry into SA politics, Dawkins was an Electorate Officer to former Senator and Howard Government Minister; the Hon. Nick Minchin, former Foreign Minister and Liberal Party Leader; the Hon. Alexander Downer AC and former Speaker of the Australian House of Representatives; the Hon. Neil Andrew AO. He has been a member and supporter of many and varied community clubs and organisations, including the Returned and Services League of Australia, and sporting and agricultural bodies.

Dawkins represented the Liberal Party of South Australia until September 2020 after he decided to nominate for the vacant Legislative Council President role. This nomination was against his own Liberal-endorsed colleague Jing Lee. Although Dawkins won the vote, he was expelled from the Liberal Party for standing against the party's endorsed candidate.

Family 

John Dawkins was born in Gawler South Australia, a small town 40 km north of South Australia’s capital Adelaide. His family owned a sheep breeding station on Gawler river and Dawkins spent much of his childhood life assisting his father.

Dawkins was the son of  the Hon. Maynard Boyd Dawkins MBE (1917–96) a sheep breeder, former member of Local Government and Member of the South Australian Legislative Council for the Liberal Party from 1962 to 1982. He is from a family of politicians and his cousin John Dawkins was also a Politician (ALP) and the Federal Treasurer of Australia (1991-1993).

Education and early work life 
Dawkins spent his secondary schooling years at Prince Alfred College and Gawler high. He then went on to his tertiary education, where he gathered an associate diploma in farm management from Glenormiston Agricultural College and a diploma in freelance journalism at Adelaide Tafe.

Before entering parliament, Dawkins was a primary producer. He then worked as an Electorate Officer to an assortment of Liberal representatives including the Hon Neil Andrew MP, Hon Alexander Downer MP and Senator the Hon Nick Minchin. Dawkins has also remained close to his roots, continuing to farm. He has continued to work at Stud Dorset and Suffolk Sheep at Gawler River.

Political career 
John Dawkins was first elected to the Legislative Council in 1997, this was an eight-year term. He was re-elected to the same position in 2006 and again in 2014. John Dawkins served as the Opposition Whip in the Legislative Council from 2002 to 2018 and he was later the President of the Legislative Council .

Representatives in the Legislative Council are members of the Upper House of the Parliament of Australia. They are elected to represent the whole state through a system, of proportional representation. Its central purpose is to act as a reviewer for legislation that is passed in the lower house. 
Committee roles

Dawkins played an active role in many parliamentary positions over the last twenty years and his main committee roles include:

-        Chairman of Rural Communities Reference Group, 1998-2002

-        Convenor of Regional Development Council, 1999-2002

-        Chairman, Regional Development Issues Group 1999-2002

-        Member of Environment, Resources and Development Committee 1997-2002

-        Member, Statutory Authorities Review Committee 1997-2002

-        Secretary, Parliamentary Christian Fellowship 1998-2000

-        Chairman, Parliamentary Christian Fellowship 2000-2003

-        Opposition Whip 2002

-        Member of Joint Parliamentary Service Committee 2003.

During his time in politics, he was most well-known for his work on suicide prevention and surrogacy.

Suicide prevention 
Suicide is the leading cause of death for South Australians between the age of 15 and 44. Within the indigenous community this rate is more than doubled. In 2019 the ABS released statistics that showed a reduction in the suicide rate for South Australia, down from 12.8% to 12% in one year (2017-2018). This statistic marks a 6.8 percent decrease and places South Australia below the national average.

John Dawkins was announced as the Premier’s Advocate for Suicide Prevention in 2018. He is also a key member of the Premier’s Council on Suicide Prevention, a body that consists of thirteen advocates that meet and discuss how South Australia can minimise the impact of suicide. In this role John Dawkins helped to facilitate the following political actions:

1. The suicide prevention plan 2017-2021

This outlines the way in which the South Australian government will reduce suicide over four years. It largely looks at the establishment of suicide prevention networks (SPN). An SPN builds a community of volunteers that aim to reduce the harm of suicide in their respective communities. This includes, cross sector collaboration between local health and primary health networks, workplace peer support, prevention and postvention initiatives. This plan aims to place an SPN in every local government in four years, with particular emphasis in areas with Aboriginal and Torres Strait islander communities.

The most notable initiative discussed in this plan is the South Australian Suicide Registry. This will become a source of trend identification to help intervention. It will involve communication between the South Australian police and the State Coroners office. This aims to help identify at risk groups and communities so that prevention networks can be put in place.

2. National communications charter

One of Dawkins achievements is the signing of the national communications charter. Launched in 2018 this charter is a set of guiding principles that assists how professionals talk about and react to issues relating to mental health. There are currently more than 600 signatures to this, including 153 organisations and more than 28 government agencies. One of these NGO agencies is Everymind. Their Acting program manager states that the charter is a “ demonstration of clear bi-partisan support that also reflects a recognition of why a unified approach to mental health and suicide prevention is so important. She emphasises that this charter is best used as a 'best practice' guide that supports safe language. This charter has eight primary principles:1.     Make mental health wellbeing and suicide prevention a priority

2.     Share nationally consistent information

3.     Use the charter as a guide for strategic communications, advocacy and awareness

4.     Respect the diversity of experience of those who suffer mental ill-health

5.     Use appropriate respectful and person-centred language

6.     Work together to maximise efforts and resources

7.     Acknowledge those with lived experience of mental ill-health

8.     Promote crisis services and help-seeking information
Suicide prevention bill 2020

3. Suicide prevention bill 2020

Additionally, John Dawkins was a major party in the drafting of the Suicide prevention Bill 2020. This bill aimed to create legislative mechanisms that would reduce the impact of suicide. Measures in the bill include:

1.     Establishing a suicide prevention council charged with introducing a state suicide prevention plan

2.     Requiring certain agencies to have their own suicide prevention plans for employees and consumers

3.     Establishing a suicide register

Surrogacy 
Dawkins has been an advocate for surrogacy his entire political career. He has publicly stated that this is due to his own experiences and the struggles he and his wife experienced when conceiving their second child.

Prior to 2014, surrogacy in south Australia was regulated by Part 2B of the Family Relationships Act 1975 (SA). In summary this act prohibited commercial surrogacy and set out the criteria for legal altruistic surrogates. Prior to 2014, surrogacy was legal when a recognised surrogacy agreement met the following requirements:

-  The surrogate mother agreed to become pregnant and surrender the custody to commissioning parents

-  Both commissioning parents must live in SA, be in a marriage or registered relationship of three years

- The commissioning parent must be struggling to fall pregnant or carry a healthy child

-  Surrogate mothers must have been assessed  by a specialist counselling service

- No money can be exchanged

- An order from the Youth Court of South Australia will confirm the legal parents of the child

- A lawyer’s certificate will confirm that the surrogate has received independent legal advice.

1. Family Relationships (Surrogacy) Amendment Bill 2014

This bill was introduced as a private member bill by John Dawkins himself. It was in response to two things. The first was the fact that after 2010 it was illegal for the biological mother to receive reimbursement for the act of surrogacy. The second factor in this amendment  was in response to what was called the baby gammy incident and questions about the viability of altruistic surrogacy. The key goal of this act was to try to make surrogacy easier, to limit overseas use of the commercial surrogacy process, and to ensure that commercial surrogacy remained illegal.

In this bill John Dawkins proposed the following amendments:

1) That it would be legal for suitable reimbursement and billable costs to be given to the surrogate mother, He believed that this reform would increase the availability and willingness of surrogates.

2) These reforms introduced a Surrogate Register (s 10FB). This allowed the Attorney-General to establish a register of South Australian women, over the age of 18, who had agreed to and would in the future agree to a surrogacy agreement.  This would not be public knowledge but could be accessed by medical professionals or relevant service providers. Since 2015 no framework has been established.

2. Surrogacy Bill 2019

The most recent reform that Dawkins helped introduce was the Surrogacy Bill 2019. This is the first time that South Australia has had stand alone surrogacy laws. The proposed reforms included:

-        raising the age of surrogacy to 25 or older

-        providing more express provisions regarding compensation for surrogacy

-        allowing gay male couples easier access surrogacy and

-        extending eligibility to single parents for the first time.

Previously in South Australia surrogacy was only accessible to those who were legally married or in registered relationships of over three years. This Bill was a response to recommendations by the South Australian Law Reform Institute and extensive consultation with the community. Vickie Chapman, Premier of South Australia personally thanked Dawkins on his work for these reforms, publicly stating: “I would like to extend my gratitude to the Hon John Dawkins MLC, who has worked tirelessly on this issue for over a decade”.

Appointment as South Australian Legislative Council President 

The President of the South Australian Legislative Council is a presiding officer, alongside the speaker of the South Australian House of Assembly. On 26 July 2020, Terry Stephens announced his retirement as council president. In response John Dawkins ran for the position himself.

After two secret ballots were tied, the new candidate was decided by “lucky dip” . The controversy in John Dawkins announcing his candidacy was that he went against the preferred Liberal candidate Jing Lee, running without his parties support. John Dawkins was announced as the new president in September 2020.

Dawkin’s decision to run for council president sparked fury amongst his party. The Tuesday after his win a party room meeting resolved to commence his expulsion proceedings. Treasurer  at the time Rob Lucas said that Dawkins expulsion was a result of "the inevitable consequences of the white-hot anger there is from a number of his colleagues".

However Dawkins maintains that he has done nothing wrong and was not the first person to act in this manner. He commented that "There have been three other members of the party who have taken the same steps as I have … one is a member of the Liberal Party to this day” .

He has stated that in his retirement he will be continuing his work on suicide prevention and likely continue his community outreach in organisations such as:

-          Returned and Services League of Australia: https://rslnational.org/

-          Rotary Club of Gawler: https://www.gawlerrotary.org.au/

-          Operation Flinders: https://operationflinders.org.au/

-          Gawler River Uniting Church: https://sa.uca.org.au/find-a-church/by-list/gawler-uniting-church

-          Northern Agricultural Shows Association: https://agshowsaustralia.org.au/

(Dawkins, 2021).

References

External links
 
Clifford, W., & Marjoram, J. (1979). Suicide in South Australia . Australian Institute of Criminology.
Clayer, J., & Czechowicz, A. (1991). Suicide by aboriginal people in South Australia : comparison with suicide deaths in the total urban and rural populations. Medical Journal of Australia, 154(10), 683–685. https://doi.org/10.5694/j.1326-5377.1991.tb121260.x
SA:SA MP wants suicide awareness raised. (2011). AAP General News Wire.
John Dawkins. (2016). Forget taboos, let’s talk about suicide. Advertiser (Adelaide, Australia : 1931), 18–.
Australia : Surrogacy now possible for more families. (2019). MENA Report.
SA:New surrogacy laws pass in SA. (2015). AAP General News Wire.

1954 births
Living people
Members of the South Australian Legislative Council
Presidents of the South Australian Legislative Council
Liberal Party of Australia members of the Parliament of South Australia
Politicians from Adelaide
20th-century Australian politicians
21st-century Australian politicians
Australian Methodists